(stylized as Αφροδιτη) is the tenth studio album by Japanese idol duo Wink, produced by Keiichi Suzuki and released by Polystar on June 25, 1993. It features the singles "Eien no Ladydoll (Voyage, Voyage)" (a cover of Desireless' "Voyage, voyage") and "Kekkon Shiyoune". In contrast to the duo's previous albums, Aphrodite contains only one cover song.

The album peaked at No. 33 on Oricon's albums chart and sold over 21,000 copies.

Track listing

Charts

Notes

References

External links 
 
 
 

1993 albums
Wink (duo) albums
Japanese-language albums